Tower Hamlets London Borough Council, the local authority for the London Borough of Tower Hamlets, is elected every four years.

Political control

Key:
αPeople's Alliance of Tower Hamlets
χTower Hamlets First

Leadership
Prior to 2010, political leadership was provided by the leader of the council, with the role of mayor at that time being largely ceremonial. The leaders from 1965 to 2010 were:

In 2010 the council changed to having directly-elected mayors with executive powers. The mayors since 2010 have been:

‡ 2014 mayoral election declared void on 23 April 2015, triggering by-election.

Council elections
 Tower Hamlets Council elections, 1964-1990
 1964 Tower Hamlets London Borough Council election
 1968 Tower Hamlets London Borough Council election
 1971 Tower Hamlets London Borough Council election
 1974 Tower Hamlets London Borough Council election
 1978 Tower Hamlets London Borough Council election (boundary changes increased the number of seats by ten)
 1982 Tower Hamlets London Borough Council election
 1986 Tower Hamlets London Borough Council election
 1990 Tower Hamlets London Borough Council election
 1994 Tower Hamlets London Borough Council election (boundary changes took place but the number of seats remained the same)
 1998 Tower Hamlets London Borough Council election
 2002 Tower Hamlets London Borough Council election (boundary changes increased the number of seats by one) 
 2006 Tower Hamlets London Borough Council election
 2010 Tower Hamlets London Borough Council election
 2014 Tower Hamlets London Borough Council election (boundary changes reduced the number of seats by six)
 2018 Tower Hamlets London Borough Council election
 2022 Tower Hamlets London Borough Council election

Mayoral elections
 2010 Tower Hamlets mayoral election

Borough result maps

By-election results

1964-1968

 The gain was from the Residents' Association.

1968-1971

1971-1974
There were no by-elections.

1974-1978

1978-1982

The by-election was called following the resignation of Cllr. Peter Gray.

The by-election was called following the resignation of Cllr. Arthur Sanders.

The by-election was called following the resignation of Cllr. Arthur M. Praag.

1982-1986

The by-election was called following the resignation of Cllr. Edward Lewis.

The by-election was called following the resignation of Cllr. Patrick A. Desmond.

The by-election was called following the resignation of Cllr. Dennis Hallam.

The by-election was called following the death of Cllr. Annie Elboz.

The by-election was called following the resignation of Cllr. John J. Boles.

1986-1990

The by-election was called following the resignation of Cllr. Belinda J. Knowles.

The by-election was called following the death of Cllr. Mohammed S. Ahmed.

The by-election was called following the resignation of Cllr. Pauline P. Fletcher.

1990-1994

The by-election was called following the death of Cllr. Margaret R. Atkins.

The by-election was called following the death of Cllr. Brenda M. Collins.

The by-election was called following the resignation of Cllr. Abbas Uddin.

The by-election was called following the resignation of Cllr. Ivan F. Walker.

The by-election was called following the resignation of Cllr. David J. Chapman.

1994-1998

The by-election was called following the death of Cllr. Albert Lilley.

The by-election was called following the resignation of Cllr. Eric A. Commons.

The by-election was called following the resignation of Cllr. Vanessa L. Peters. 

The by-election was called following the resignation of Cllr. John P. Ryan.

The by-election was called following the resignation of Cllr. Amanda Linton.

1998-2002

The by-election was called following the death of Cllr. Albert J. Snooks.

2002-2006

The by-election was called following the resignation of Cllr. Lutfur R. Ali.

The by-election was called following the disqualification of Cllr. Nasir Uddin.

The by-election was called following the resignation of Cllr. Mumtaz Samad.

2006-2010

The by-election was called following the resignation of Cllr. Shamin A. Chowdhury.

The by-election was called following the resignation of Cllr. Simon P. Rouse.

The by-election was called following the resignation of Cllr. Louise Alexander.

The by-election was called following the resignation of Cllr. Rupert Bawden.

2010-2014

The by-election was called following the resignation of Cllr. Lutfur Rahman.

The by-election was called following the disqualification of Cllr. Ms. Shelina Akhtar.

The by-election was called following the resignation of Cllr. Ms. Anna S. Lynch.

2014–2018

A by-election for the ward of Stepney Green was held on 11 June 2015, after the sitting councillor, Alibor Choudhury, was found guilty of corrupt and illegal practices by an election court.

A by-election for the ward of Whitechapel was held on 1 December 2016, after the sitting councillor, Shahed Ali, was found guilty of housing fraud. Another independent candidate, Ahmed Shafi, won the seat.

2018-2022

The by-election was called following the resignation of Cllr. Ruhul Amin.

The by-election was called following the resignation of Cllr. Mohammad Harun.

The by-election was called following the death of Cllr. John Pierce.

See also
Derek Beackon

References

External links
Tower Hamlets Council website